Kenni Arendt Larsen (born 14 June 1988), known as both Kenni Arendt and Kenni Larsen, is a former motorcycle speedway rider from Denmark.

Career
Born in Odense, Denmark, Larsen began his British speedway career in 2008 with Newcastle Diamonds, the first of three seasons that he rode for the club. In 2010 he won the Premier Trophy, the Premier League Knockout Cup, and the Premier League play-offs with Newcastle. In 2011 he moved up to the Elite League with Coventry Bees, staying with them in 2012 and captaining the team at Birmingham, a season in which he finished third in the team's averages. For 2013 he has signed for Peterborough Panthers.

He has also raced in Denmark for Vojens and Outrup and also in Poland and Sweden.

On 19 April 2016 Larsen was hospitalised and put into an induced coma after having a pellet removed from his brain following an apparent accident with an air gun. He woke from the coma on 1 May.

References

External links

1988 births
Living people
Sportspeople from Odense
Danish speedway riders
Newcastle Diamonds riders
Coventry Bees riders
Peterborough Panthers riders